HM Prison Hewell is a multiple security category men's prison in the village of Tardebigge in Worcestershire, England. The prison is operated by His Majesty's Prison Service. 

On 16 October 2019, the Ministry of Justice announced that HMP Hewell's open site (the former HMP Hewell Grange) will close due to its current condition branded by inspectors as unacceptable and refurbishing would not deliver value for the taxpayer.

History
Hewell Prison is on the site of the Hewell Grange country house and estate, the former seat of the Earls of Plymouth and has open days for its park and garden. The estate was sold to the government c.1945 and in 1946 the main house was used as a Borstal.

Over the years two other purpose-built prisons were built and opened on the estate: HMP Blakenhurst and HMP Brockhill, to hold other categories of prisoner, with enlargements. The Borstal itself was reclassified in 1991 to a Category D open prison, and renamed HMP Hewell Grange. The new 650-bed prison was operated by UK Detention Services, a partnership between Mowlem, Sir Robert McAlpine and Corrections Corporation of America.

In January 2008, the Prison Service announced that the three prisons would merge to be managed by a single team. Its provisional name for public consultation was 'HMP Redditch', however local residents objected and in March 2008 it was decided to rename the site HMP Hewell. HMP Hewell was formally created on 25 June 2008, and is the first in an efficiency drive involving the creation of new Titan prisons in the United Kingdom.

The Ministry of Justice closed the Brockhill part of the prison in September 2011. The closure formed part of wide-ranging cost saving, with one other prison shut in 2011.

In July 2017, Tornado squads were brought in from outside to deal with a prison riot in House Block 6, A-spur. The riot was instigated following the commencement of a phased smoking ban, of which House Block 6 was the first to have the ban imposed; overcrowding, living conditions, unexplained lock-downs and lack of prison officer staff were all contributing factors. The rioters damaged water pipework, the CCTV system, and numerous cells were severely damaged. The trouble was confined to one area of the prison, that was back in the control of the prison officers within a few hours.
The wing where the riot took place was deemed unfit for occupation due to the damage caused, and inmates housed in that area were either moved to other prisons or relocated to other cell blocks within Hewell. It took several weeks for the area to be brought back into use, following extensive renovations and works to repair the damage caused.

The prison today

Hewell is a multiple security category prison for adult males. Different categories (B, C, and D) of prisoners are housed in different sites. The prison primarily serves the Worcestershire, West Midlands and Warwickshire catchment area. Accommodation at the prison is divided into 6 house blocks. House block 8, which formerly referred to the "open" or Category D section of the prison, was recently closed, due to a damning report by inspectors.

Category B & C prisoners are employed in workshops providing Construction Industry Training, double glazing manufacture, industrial cleaning, waste management, laundry and contract services. Education offered includes ICT courses, ESOL, basic literacy and numeracy, art and cookery classes.

Category D prisoners used to have access to external college courses, Open University distance learning, as well as a range of ICT, literacy and numeracy courses. Employment was provided throughout the estate including:
Farms
Gardens
Kitchen
Full-time employment via a Resettlement to Work Scheme.

In January 2017, an inspection report described Hewell as "a prison with many challenges and areas of serious concern".  Prison inspector, Peter Clarke said, the "main concerns at the closed site were regarding issues of safety and respect". Clarke said levels of violence were "far too high", he described communal areas as "dirty" and claimed many cells were over-crowded, with some, "filthy".  60% said getting drugs was easy, a quarter of prisoners felt unsafe, and self harm had increased.

In December 2017, ten people were convicted of smuggling a range of contraband into Hewell and other prisons following the chance filming of a wildlife program in adjacent fields.

In 2019, a prisoner died of burns after smoking spice and setting himself on fire.  The prisoner rang his bell but it took sixteen minutes before staff responded.  The delay in responding contributed to the prisoner's death.

On 16 October 2019, the  Ministry of Justice announced that HMP Hewell's open site (the former HMP Hewell Grange) would close due to its current condition branded by inspectors as unacceptable and refurbishing would not deliver value for the taxpayer.

See also
 Hewell Grange

References

External links
Ministry of Justice pages on Hewell
HMP Hewell – HM Inspectorate of Prisons Reports
Hewell Grange entry from The DiCamillo Companion to British & Irish Country Houses
HMP Brockhill – HM Inspectorate of Prisons Reports

Category B prisons in England
Category C prisons in England
Category D prisons in England
Prisons in Worcestershire
1946 establishments in England
Hewell